In religious or mythological cosmology, the seven heavens refer to seven levels or divisions of the Heavens. The concept, also found in the ancient Mesopotamian religions, can be found in Judaism, Christianity, and Islam; a similar concept is also found in some other religions such as Hinduism. Some of these traditions, including Jainism, also have a concept of seven earths or seven underworlds both with the metaphysical realms of deities and with observed celestial bodies such as the classical planets and fixed stars.

To each of the seven heavens corresponds one of the seven classical planets known in antiquity. Ancient observers noticed that these heavenly objects (the Moon, Mercury, Venus, the Sun, Mars, Jupiter, and Saturn) moved at different paces in the sky both from each other and from the fixed stars beyond them. Unlike comets, which appeared in the sky with no warning, they did move in regular patterns that could be predicted. They also observed that objects in the sky influenced objects on earth as when movements of the sun affect the behavior of plants or movements of the moon affect ocean tides. Others believe the seven heavens are related to the seven stars of Orion, the Big Dipper, Little Dipper and the Pleaides/Seven Sisters according to ancient western astrology.

Mesopotamian religion
The concept of seven heavens as developed in ancient Mesopotamia symbolised both physical and metaphysical concepts. In the Sumerian language, the words for heavens (or sky) and earth are An and Ki. The ancient Mesopotamians regarded the sky as a series of domes (usually three, but sometimes seven) covering the flat earth. Each dome was made of a different kind of precious stone. The lowest dome of the heavens was made of jasper and was the home of the stars. The middle dome of heaven was made of saggilmut stone and was the abode of the Igigi. The highest and outermost dome of the heavens was made of luludānītu stone and was personified as An, the god of the sky. The celestial bodies were equated with specific deities as well. The planet Venus was believed to be Inanna, the goddess of love, sex, and war. The sun was her brother Utu, the god of justice, and the moon was their father Nanna. Ordinary mortals could not go to the heavens because it was the abode of the gods alone. Instead, after a person died, his or her soul went to Kur (later known as Irkalla), a dark shadowy underworld, located deep below the surface of the earth. Sumerian incantations of the late second millennium BCE make references to seven heavens and seven earths. One such incantation is: "an-imin-bi ki-imin-bi" (the heavens are seven, the earths are seven.)

The understanding that the heavens can influence things on earth lent heavenly, magical properties to the number seven itself, as in stories of seven demons, seven churches, seven spirits, or seven thrones. The number seven appears frequently in Babylonian magical rituals. The seven Jewish and the seven Islamic heavens may have had their origin in Babylonian astronomy.

In general, the heavens is not a place for humans in Mesopotamian religion. As Gilgamesh says to his friend Enkidu, in the Epic of Gilgamesh: "Who can go up to the heavens, my friend? Only the gods dwell with Shamash forever". Along with the idea of seven heavens, the idea of three heavens was also common in ancient Mesopotamia.

Abrahamic religions

Judaism
In the Talmud, it is suggested that the upper part of the universe is made up of seven heavens (Hebrew: shamayim):

 Vilon (וילון), see
 Raki'a (רקיע), see
 Shehaqim (שחקים), see (Midr. Teh. to Ps. xix. 7)
 Zebul (זבול), see
 Ma'on (מעון), see
 Machon (מכון), see
 Araboth (ערבות), The seventh Heaven where ophanim, the seraphim, and the hayyoth and the Throne of God are located.

The Jewish Merkavah and Hekhalot literature was devoted to discussing the details of these heavens, sometimes in connection with traditions relating to Enoch, such as the Third Book of Enoch.

Apocryphal texts
The Second Book of Enoch, also written in the first century CE, describes the mystical ascent of the patriarch Enoch through a hierarchy of Ten Heavens. Enoch passes through the Garden of Eden in the Third Heaven on his way to meet the Lord face-to-face in the Tenth (chapter 22). Along the way, he encounters vividly described populations of angels who torment wrongdoers; he sees homes, olive oil, and flowers.

The book's depiction of ten heavens represented an expansion of the ancient seven-heaven model. This expanded cosmology was developed further in medieval Christianity.

Christianity

The New Testament does not refer to the concept of seven heavens. However, an explicit reference to a third heaven appears in the Second Epistle to the Corinthians, penned in Macedonia around 55 CE. It describes the following mystical experience:

The description is usually taken as an oblique reference by the author to himself. The passage appears to reflect first-century beliefs among Jews and Christians that the realm of Paradise existed in a different heaven than the highest one—an impression that may find support in the original Greek wording (closer to "caught away" than "caught up").

In the second century, Irenaeus also knows seven heavens (see his Demonstration of Apostolic Preaching 9; cf. Against Heresies 1.5.2).

Over the course of the Middle Ages, Christian thinkers expanded the ancient Mesopotamian seven-heaven model into a system of ten heavens. This cosmology, taught in the first European universities by the Scholastics, reached its supreme literary expression in The Divine Comedy by Dante Alighieri.

Islam

The Quran and Hadith frequently mention the existence of seven samāwāt (سماوات), the plural of samāʾ (سماء), meaning 'heaven, sky, celestial sphere', and cognate with Hebrew shamāyim (שמים). Some of the verses in the Quran mentioning the samaawat are Q41:12, Q65:12 and Q71:15. The seven heavens are not final destinations for the dead after the Day of Judgment, but regions distinct from the earth, guarded by angels and inhabited by souls whose abode depends on their good deeds (fasting, jihad, Hajj, charity), with the highest layer, the closest to God.

In other sources, the concept is presented in metaphorical terms. Each of the seven heavens is depicted as being composed of a different material, and Islamic prophets are resident in each. The names are taken from Suyuti's Al-Hay’a as-samya fi l-hay’a as-sunmya:
 Raqi'a (رقيعاء): The first heaven is described as being made of water and is the home of Adam and Eve, as well as the angels of each star. According to some narratives, Muhammad encountered the angel Habib here.
 Araqlun (أزفلون): The second heaven is described as being made of white pearls and is the home of Yahya (John the Baptist) and Isa (Jesus).
 Qaydum (قيدوم): The third heaven is described as being made of iron (alternatively pearls or other dazzling stones); Joseph and the Angel of Death (named Azrael) are resident there.
 Maʿuna (ماعونا): The fourth heaven is described as being made of brass (alternatively white gold); Idris (conventionally identified with Enoch) and the "Angel of Tears" resides there. 
 Di'a (ريقا): The fifth heaven is described as being made of silver; Aaron holds court over this heaven. Sometimes, the guardian of hellfire is assigned to this place.
 Daqua (دقناء): The sixth heaven is described as being composed of gold (alternatively garnets and rubies); Moses can be found here.
 ʿAriba (عريبا): The seventh heaven, which borrows some concepts from its Jewish counterpart, is depicted as being composed of divine light incomprehensible to the mortal man (alternatively emerald). Abraham is a resident there and Sidrat al-Muntaha, a large enigmatic Lote tree, marks the end of the seventh heaven and the utmost extremity for all of God's creatures and heavenly knowledge.

There are two interpretations of using the number "seven". One viewpoint is that the number "seven" here simply means "many" and is not to be taken literally (the number is often used to imply that in the Arabic language). But many other commentators use the number literally.

One modern interpretation of "heavens" is that all the stars and galaxies (including the Milky Way) are all part of the "first heaven", and "beyond that six still bigger worlds are there," which have yet to be discovered by scientists.

Gnosticism
The Gnostic text On the Origin of the World states that seven heavens were created in Chaos by Yaldabaoth below the higher realms, and each of them are ruled over by an Archon. During the end times, these heavens will collapse on each and the heaven of Yaldabaoth will split in two, causing its stars to fall upon the Earth, therefore causing it to sink into the Abyss.

In the Coptic Apocalypse of Paul, the apostle Paul ascends through the lower Seven Heavens. At the seventh heaven, he meets an old man who opens the gate to the realm beyond the material universe, and Paul then ascends to the eighth, ninth, and tenth heavens.

In Mandaeism, a series of maṭartas, or "toll houses," are located between the World of Light (alma ḏ-nhūra) from Tibil (Earth). The term maṭarta has variously been translated as "watch-station", "toll-station", "way-station", or "purgatory". Maṭartas are guarded by various uthras (celestial beings from the World of Light) and demons. In the Ginza Rabba, seven maṭartas are listed and described in Chapter 3 in Book 5 of the Right Ginza. However, the number of maṭartas is not always seven; Book 6 of the Right Ginza (also known as the "Book of Dinanukht") lists six, and Chapter 4 in Book 1 of the Left Ginza lists eight. Alternatively, the Seven Heavens can also be seen as corresponding to the Seven Planets, who form part of the entourage of Ruha in the World of Darkness.

Hinduism
According to some Puranas, the Brahmanda is divided into fourteen worlds. Seven are upper worlds, Bhuloka (the Earth), Bhuvarloka, Svarloka, Maharloka, Janarloka, Tapoloka and Satyaloka, and seven are lower worlds, Atala, Vitala, Sutala, Talatala, Mahatala, Rasatala and Patala.

Seven-level underworlds
According to Jain cosmology, there are seven levels of Naraka or hell. These are further divided into 8,400,000 other hellish locations.
Inanna visited the Sumerian seven-gated underworld.

See also
As above, so below
Clime
Empyrean
Garden of the gods (Sumerian paradise)
Hierarchy of angels
Isra and Mi'raj
Jewish angelic hierarchy
Loka
Matarta in Mandaeism
Ogdoad
Religious cosmology
Seven Logas
Third Heaven

References

Bibliography
Davidson, Gustav. Dictionary of Angels: Including the Fallen Angels. New York: The Free Press, 1967 (reprinted 1994). .
Ginzberg, Louis. Henrietta Szold (trans.). The Legends of the Jews. Philadelphia: The Jewish Publication Society of America, 1909–1938. .

External links

Higher Devachanic or Seven Heavenly Spheres

Christian terminology
Conceptions of heaven
Heaven in Christianity
Heaven
Hindu cosmology
Islamic cosmology
Islamic mysticism
Islamic terminology
Jewish mysticism
Religious cosmologies